Galushkinsky is a rural locality (a khutor) and the administrative center of Galushkinskoye Rural Settlement, Novoanninsky District, Volgograd Oblast, Russia. The population was 867 as of 2010. There are 15 streets.

Geography 
Galushkinsky is located on the Khopyorsko-Buzulukskaya Plain, on the right bank of the Kardail River, 31 km northeast of Novoanninsky (the district's administrative centre) by road. Dubrovsky is the nearest rural locality.

References 

Rural localities in Novoanninsky District